The Woen's pole vault event  at the 2005 European Athletics Indoor Championships was held on March 4–6.

Medalists

Results
Qualification: Qualification performance 4.50 (Q) or at least 8 best performers advanced to the final.

Final

References
Results

Pole vault at the European Athletics Indoor Championships
Pole
2005 in women's athletics